Concordia Lutheran Church, or, in Swedish, Lutherska Konkordiekyrkan, is a small Lutheran denomination in Sweden. It currently consists of one congregation, with about 20 members spread around Sweden.

History 
The church traces its roots back to the 1970s, when an independent Lutheran congregation was formed by some pastors and laypeople that had left the Church of Sweden in protest against its doctrinal liberalism. The denomination was formally incorporated in 1984.

Doctrine 
CLC is a confessional Lutheran church. The church believes that the Bible as the inerrant word of God, the only guide for Christian doctrine, and that the Lutheran confessions are a correct interpretation of the Bible. Its stances on justification and salvation are in line with the orthodox Lutheran teaching of grace alone and faith alone. The church firmly stresses the real presence in the Lord's Supper.

Differences from the Lutheran Confessional Church in Sweden 
CLC differs on some doctrinal points from the Lutheran Confessional Church (LBK), which is the largest of the independent confessional Lutheran churches in Sweden. The LBK is in doctrinal agreement with the Wisconsin Evangelical Lutheran Synod (WELS).

The Lord's Supper
The CLC believes that the words of consecration, spoken by the pastor, immediately assure us of the real presence. The LBK and the WELS believe that one may not declare either the consecrationist or distributionist positions as doctrine because it only finds Scriptural support for the real presence in the sacrament as a whole rather than fixed to any definite instant. CLC believes that all bread and wine that are consecrated are to be consumed. The LBK and the WELS do not require this.

The Ministry
The CLC believes that the office of the pastor is a single, special, God-ordained office of the church to the exclusion of other offices, such as those of teachers. The LBK and the WELS believes that the pastoral office and other offices all fall under one ministry of the Gospel.

References

External links
Official website



Lutheranism in Sweden
Lutheran denominations established in the 20th century
Christian organizations established in 1984
Christian denominations in Sweden